"Nobody Gonna Tell Me What to Do" is a song recorded by American country music duo Van Zant. It was released in September 2005 as the second single from their album Get Right with the Man. The song was written by Tony Mullins, Tim Nichols and Craig Wiseman.

Critical reception
In his review of the song, Kevin John Coyne of Country Universe called the duo "a great southern rock addition to the genre."

Music video
The music video was directed by Trey Fanjoy and premiered in September 2005.

Chart performance
The song debuted at number 59 on the U.S. Billboard Hot Country Songs chart for the week of October 8, 2005.

References

2005 singles
2005 songs
Van Zant (band) songs
Columbia Records singles
Songs written by Tim Nichols
Songs written by Craig Wiseman
Music videos directed by Trey Fanjoy
Song recordings produced by Mark Wright (record producer)
Songs written by Tony Mullins